Cap-Haïtien International Airport  is a minor international airport serving Cap-Haïtien, a city in Nord, Haiti. It is the second largest airport in Haiti. This airport connects Haiti to airports like Miami International Airport, Providenciales International Airport, Cibao International Airport, and among others in the Caribbean region. The last airport for refueling for general aviation coming from the Bahamas into Haiti is Inagua Airport, located in Great Inagua, located at Matthew Town (IATA: IGA, ICAO: MYIG).

History
 
The Haitian government signed a deal with Venezuela for the airport to be renovated. On September 13, 2010, a  concrete runway was being built by Haitian firms and personnel working under the supervision of a Cuban-Venezuelan firm. The extended 7,500 ft runway was completely repaved in October 2012, with the rest of the reconstruction finished by February 2013. Part of the work consisted of rerouting a road around the airstrip that had previously bisected it.

On 18 April 2013, a spokesman for Haitian Prime Minister Laurent Lamothe announced that the airport will be renamed to "Hugo Chávez International Airport" in honour of the late Venezuelan President, a day before Haitian President Michel Martelly was scheduled to attend Nicolás Maduro's inauguration ceremony in Caracas. A statement by the Prime Minister's spokesman Gary Bodeau said "President Chávez has done his best to help Haiti in the most difficult times. He has contributed over $1 billion to assist Haiti and is beloved by the Haitian people. As a tribute to him, and for his work to Haiti, we have decided to name the airport in Cap-Haïtien in his honor." However, plans to rename the airport fell through.

In 2019, Spirit Airlines cancelled its scheduled service between Cap-Haïtien and Fort Lauderdale.  In 2020, American Airlines terminated its service to Miami, leaving Cap-Haïtien with no scheduled commercial passenger service to the United States. On 1 October 2020, Spirit Airlines announced it would resume nonstop service to Fort Lauderdale-Hollywood International Airport beginning 3 December, 2020.

Facilities
The runway was extended to 2,286 m (7,500 ft) and completely repaved in a two-year reconstruction that finished in February 2013, with the actual runway opening in October 2012, although the change was not immediately made on the DAFIF database.

Airlines and destinations

The following airlines operate regular scheduled and charter services at the airport:

Cargo

References

External links
  Cap-Haitien Airport at Autorité Aeroportuaire Nationale
  Autorité Aeroportuaire Nationale
 

Cap
Airport International
Nord (Haitian department)
Cap-Haïtien